Juan Dolio is a small seaside community and tourist destination in the province of San Pedro de Macoris on the southern coast of the Dominican Republic on the island of Hispaniola. Juan Dolio has 2,488 inhabitants (2010  ) and belongs to the district municipality Guayacanes.

Geographical location
 The former fishing village of Juan Dolio is located on the Caribbean Sea and extends over a length of about 7 km along the coast and on both sides of the access road Avenida Boulevard passing through Juan Dolio. The western and eastern end of the access road Avenida Boulevard connects Juan Dolio with the highway DR-3 Autovia Del Este which bypasses the village in the north.

The distance to the country's capital Santo Domingo, located west of Juan Dolio, is about 50 km and the provincial capital of San Pedro de Macorís is about 12 km in the eastern direction. While the north and east of the village consists mainly of wide pastures, fallow land and sugar cane fields, the western part of Juan Dolio passes almost seamlessly into the community of Guayacanes. Also in the western direction are the tourist town Boca Chica (approx. 23 km) and the Las Américas International Airport (30 km).

History

In the pre-Columbian era, Juan Dolio was the site of an indigenous Arawaks settlement of the Taíno people known as El Corral with its cemetery near the western end of the bay. The natural bay of the Playa Juan Dolio protected by the coral reef in front was used as a harbor for their canoes. Occasionally, archaeological findings are still made in the center area of Juan Dolio.

Since the late nineteenth century the community of Juan Dolio was a section of the municipality of San José de los Llanos. On May 8, 1884, by Decree No. 2223, the communities of Juan Dolio and Guayacanes were segregated and added to the Maritime District of San Pedro de Macoris.

The legal foundation of the tourist destination Juan Dolio, began with the enactment of Decree No. 3133 of January 23, 1973, which sets the limits and extension of the area populated by fishermen and farmers.
During the late 1980s Juan Dolio became one of the first tourist resorts in the country and an exclusive destination for mainly European tourists. Later the business concept of an All-inclusive resort offered by the various hotels lead to a tourist boom and the construction of new hotels in the western part of Juan Dolio, Villas Del Mar. In 1995 the hotels in Juan Dolio had a daily average of 5,500 tourists. 
After Hurricane Georges devastated Juan Dolio in 1998, many of the hotel chains moved their business further east where the new tourist destination Bávaro-Punta Cana was just built from the ground. The owners of the damaged resorts in Juan Dolio had problems attracting new business partners and most of the beach hotels were closed. Some of the older hotels were demolished and became development sites for real estate projects.

With the low cost of properties after the hurricane damage, developers found a new opportunity and started second homes projects in the area. Projects like Guavaberry Golf Club, Club Hemingway and Metro Country Club became very popular, and a new business model was adopted creating a destination dedicated to the media industries. 

Since 2006 Juan Dolio is part of the municipality of Guayacanes, the latest district in the San Pedro de Macorís Province, created by Law No. 203-06 of May 3, 2006.
Formally established in December 2007, the town council of Guayacanes is now also responsible for the administration of Juan Dolio.

In 2015 the film studios Pinewood was established in the community creating a revival of Juan Dolio. 

Many sports celebrities and business personalities choose Juan Dolio as their main residence or vacations home for the privacy and security in town.

Infrastructure

The center of the elongated village is located near the bay Playa Juan Dolio, which is a popular beach among locals and visitors. The bay is also used by the remaining few local fishermen to land their boats.

In the north-west of the town center lies the district of Mar Del Sol, in the north lies the gated community of the Metro Golf & Country Club and in the east of the center begins the district of Villas Del Mar. The western part of Juan Dolio adjoins the neighboring community and administration headquarters of the district, Guayacanes.

The village is traversed by a main street, Calle Principal, running parallel to the beach and the access road Boulevard. On weekends the Calle Principal can be driven in only one direction from west to east. Located along the main street are numerous small shops, restaurants, bars, guesthouses, mostly small residential buildings and an occasional multi-story apartment building.

Newly created during the past two decades, at the eastern end of the Calle Principal starts the district of Villas Del Mar, which also houses the two major beach resorts of Juan Dolio. Financially strong investors have used Villas Del Mar in the past repeatedly for their real estate development projects. The zone is characterized by modern high-rising apartment towers and some luxurious residential complexes, in some cases still under construction.

Beaches

The beach in the center of the community, the Playa Juan Dolio, is publicly accessible and provides parking spaces for visitors. The view from the main road to the beach of Villas del Mar, the Playa Real, is blocked by high-rising condo buildings. The free access to the Playa Real is often limited by the private security personnel of the different condo towers along the beach.
All beaches in the different sections of Juan Dolio were renewed and extended within a government project in the winter of 2006/07 and attract, especially on weekends, a growing number of visitors. The public beach of Juan Dolio, the Playa Juan Dolio, is not as famous as the beach of the tourist town Boca Chica for instance, but seems more natural and unspoiled. Coconut palms grow on the sand, the sea is turquoise and there is no large hotel in sight.

References

Populated places in San Pedro de Macorís Province
Beaches of the Dominican Republic